Granite Island is a  island in Lake Superior located about  northwest of Marquette in the Upper Peninsula of the U.S. state of Michigan.  Built upon it is the Granite Island Lighthouse, also known as Granite Island Light Station, "one of the oldest surviving lighthouses on Lake Superior". It is part of Marquette Township, in Marquette County.

Geography 
The Native Americans called the island Na-Be-Quon. That apparently meant something like 'vessel'. They called a steamship an ishcoda nabequon. which was roughly translated as 'fire vessel.'

Navigational aid 

On March 2, 1867, Congress appropriated $20,000 for construction of the lighthouse on the island. In 1868, spring brought the arrival of the lighthouse tender Haze, which landed a construction crew and building supplies. Flattening the top of the island to provide a foundation was difficult and required blasting. Davits were installed, as there was originally no plan for a dock. After a lengthy delay, a fog signal was installed. Life on the island was difficult and did entail loss of life.

Its characteristic is a white flash every 6 seconds.

Current status 
Despite its remoteness, and because of its picturesque location, form and color it is often the subject of photographs, and drawings.

The island's infrastructure is host to an Internet relay station operated by Northern Michigan University to provide live real-time classes to the rural area of Big Bay and its school system. Power on the island is remote controlled year round and consists of solar panels, wind generators with back up propane generators.

The island's owners have donated a sophisticated weather research station. This station is operated by Northern Michigan University and the data is made available to the National Weather Service to aid in Near Shore Forecasting and to study the evaporative effects on the rise and fall of the water levels in the Great Lakes. In July 2018 NASA installed a station to measure radiation and cloud cover as part of the Clouds and the Earth Radiant Energy System.

The living quarters of the light station is made available to the NMU English Department for creative writing retreats.

Notes

Further reading
Stonehouse, Frederick. (1974) Marquette Shipwrecks. Marquette, MI: Harboridge Press.

External links

 Aerial photos, Granite Island Light, marinas.com.
 Granite Island home page (including webcams and virtual tour).

Islands of Marquette County, Michigan
Uninhabited islands of Michigan
Islands of Lake Superior in Michigan
Private islands of Michigan
Private islands of the Great Lakes